In mathematics, Racah polynomials are orthogonal polynomials named after Giulio Racah, as their orthogonality relations are equivalent to his orthogonality relations for Racah coefficients.

Orthogonality

when ,
where  is the Racah polynomial,

 is the Kronecker delta function and the weight functions are

and

 is the Pochhammer symbol.

Rodrigues-type formula

where  is the backward difference operator,

Generating functions
There are three generating functions for 
when or

when or

when or

Connection formula for Wilson polynomials
When 

where  are Wilson polynomials.

q-analog
 introduced the q-Racah polynomials defined in terms of basic hypergeometric functions by

They are sometimes given with changes of variables as

References

Orthogonal polynomials